Hacısait  is a small village in Mut district of  Mersin Province, Turkey. At  it is situated to the west of the Göksu River valley. The population of the village was 90 as of 2012.

References

Villages in Mut District